This is a list of current and historic lighthouses and lightvessels in Russia.  On saltwater, Russia has had lighthouses on the Black Sea, on the Baltic Sea in the Kaliningrad Oblast exclave, on the Gulf of Finland approaching St. Petersburg, on the Arctic Ocean (including a series of nuclear-powered ones), and on the Pacific Ocean.  It has had lighthouses on freshwater of Lake Ladoga, on the Volga and Don Rivers, on the Caspian Sea, on Lake Baikal, in Siberia on the great Ob and Yenisey Rivers, and elsewhere.

Lighthouses
Notable Russian lighthouses include:

See also
 Lists of lighthouses and lightvessels
 Russian Hydrographic Service
 Russian lightvessels

References

External links

 

Russia

Lighthouses
Lighthouses